Hat Kata is a beach on the west coast of the island of Phuket.

Geography 
Hat Kata is about 17 kilometers from Phuket Town. It faces the Andaman Sea. There are two adjacent beaches called Kata Yai and Kata Noi.

Transportation

Airport
Hat Kata is about 47 kilometers from Phuket International Airport.

Phuket Town
Hat Kata is about a half-hour by car and an hour by local bus served at Downtown Market station.

Patong Beach
Hat Kata is about 10 kilometers from Patong Beach by crossing the Karon hill and passing Karon Beach.

Events 
The week-long Phuket King's Cup Regatta is one of Asia's biggest and most popular regattas.

See also
 Phuket Province

References

External links

Beaches of Phuket Province